Huinan County is a county of southwestern Jilin province, China.

Administrative divisions
There are 10 towns and one ethnic township.

Towns:
Chaoyang, Yangzishao, Shansonggang, Jinchuan, Shidaohe, Huifacheng, Huinan, Qingyang, Fumin, Tuanlin

The only township is Loujie Korean Ethnic Township

Climate

References

External links

County-level divisions of Jilin